"Apollo" is an English-language song performed by Swiss band Timebelle. The song represented Switzerland in the Eurovision Song Contest 2017. It was written by Elias Näslin, Nicolas Günthardt, and Alessandra Günthardt. The song was released as a digital download on 10 March 2017.

Eurovision Song Contest

On 5 December 2016, Timebelle was announced as one of the six competing artists in ESC 2017 – Die Entscheidungsshow, Switzerland's national final for the Eurovision Song Contest 2017. They performed last during the final, held on 5 February 2017, and won the competition with nearly 48% of the public vote. Switzerland competed in the second half of the second semi-final at the Eurovision Song Contest, but failed to qualify for the final.

Track listing

Other versions
 7th Heaven (club mix) - 5:48
 7th Heaven (radio edit) - 3:27

Charts

Release history

References

Eurovision songs of Switzerland
Eurovision songs of 2017
2016 songs
2017 singles
English-language Swiss songs
Songs containing the I–V-vi-IV progression